The Roman Catholic Diocese of Picos is a diocese located in the city of Picos in the Ecclesiastical province of Teresina in Brazil.

History
 28 October 1974: Established as Diocese of Picos from the Diocese of Oeiras and Metropolitan Archdiocese of Teresina

Bishops
 Bishops of Picos (Roman rite), in reverse chronological order
 Bishop Plínio José Luz da Silva (2003.11.26 – present)
 Bishop Augusto Alves da Rocha (1975.05.23 – 2001.10.24), appointed Bishop of Oeiras-Floriano, Piaui

Other priest of this diocese who became bishop
Alfredo Schäffler, appointed Coadjutor Bishop of Parnaíba, Piaui in 2000

References
 GCatholic.org
 Catholic Hierarchy
Diocese Website

Roman Catholic dioceses in Brazil
Christian organizations established in 1974
Picos, Roman Catholic Diocese of
Roman Catholic dioceses and prelatures established in the 20th century